Plotosus canius is a species of eeltail catfish, in the genus Plotosus, native to the Indian Ocean, the western Pacific Ocean and New Guinea.

References

External links 
http://www.fishbase.org/summary/Plotosus-canius.html
 Eel catfish @ Fishes of Australia

Plotosidae
Fish of Thailand
Marine fish of Northern Australia
Fish described in 1822